Will D. Mortenson is an American attorney and a member of the South Dakota House of Representatives representing District 24 since January 2021.

Early life and education
Will Mortenson was born in Pierre, South Dakota and graduated from T. F. Riggs High School. He is an enrolled member of the Cheyenne River Sioux Tribe.

Mortenson attended University of South Dakota where he received his B.A. He ran the 2010 reelection campaign of Public Utilities Commissioner Dusty Johnson, then worked in the Office of Governor Dennis Daugaard as a policy analyst, before attending the University of Virginia School of Law graduating with his J.D. in 2016.

Political career
Mortenson first ran for the South Dakota House of Representatives from District 24 in 2020. He won the primary in June 2020 and the general election on November 3, 2020. In 2021, Mortenson filed articles of impeachment against Attorney General Jason Ravnsborg, and again in 2022, leading to Ravnsborg's removal from office.

In 2022, Mortenson was selected to serve as House Majority Leader by his Republican colleagues in the State House of Representatives. He is the youngest Republican to serve as House Majority Leader in state history, and the first tribal member to lead a majority caucus.

Election history

References

External links
Official page at the South Dakota Legislature

Living people
Democratic Party members of the South Dakota House of Representatives
South Dakota lawyers
1987 births
21st-century American politicians
People from Pierre, South Dakota
University of South Dakota alumni
University of Virginia School of Law alumni